An election to Lancashire County Council took place on 4 May 2017 as part of the 2017 local elections across the UK. All 84 councillors were elected for single-member and dual-member divisions for a four-year term of office.  The system of voting used is first-past-the-post. Elections are held in all electoral divisions across the present ceremonial county, excepting Blackpool and Blackburn with Darwen which are unitary authorities.

Conservative councillors won an overall majority in the council and formed a majority administration, Labour councillors form the second-largest grouping and UKIP's win of a seat was its single gain nationally in the 2017 local election cycle which saw all 145 of its other candidates standing in the election lose their seats.

Electoral divisions
Boundary revisions by the Local Government Boundary Commission for England meant these elections were fought on new divisions.

Summary

Results by borough

Burnley borough

Chorley borough

Fylde borough

Hyndburn borough

Lancaster city

Pendle borough

Preston city

Ribble Valley borough

Rossendale borough

South Ribble borough

West Lancashire borough

Wyre borough

Notes and references
References

Notes

2017 English local elections
2017